The Louis Johnson Water Tank House near Richfield, Idaho, United States, is believed to have been built in the 1910s by sheep rancher and stonemason Bill Darrah.  It was listed on the National Register of Historic Places in 1983.

It is larger and taller than other water tank houses built by Darrah in the region, and probably provided water for several residences.

References

Buildings and structures completed in 1910
Buildings and structures in Lincoln County, Idaho
Agricultural buildings and structures on the National Register of Historic Places in Idaho
Water tanks on the National Register of Historic Places
National Register of Historic Places in Lincoln County, Idaho